"Leavin' on Your Mind" is a country pop song written by Wayne Walker and Webb Pierce, first recorded by Canadian singer Joyce Smith in 1962.

Patsy Cline was in Owen Bradley's office one day, heard the record Smith made, and immediately wanted the song for herself.  According to Smith, "He said, 'No you can't have it. I'm going to see what that Canadian gal does with it'." Smith's single, released in 1962, did not reach the top 40, but it sold more than 100,000 copies, a hit for a first record and enough that Smith recouped the studio expenses and made a little money in royalties.

Cline recorded the song later in 1962 and released it in 1963. It was her last single before she died in a plane crash in March of that year. Unlike her earlier hits "Crazy" and "I Fall to Pieces", "Leavin' On Your Mind" stalled at #83 on the Billboard Hot 100 chart. However, the song went to #8 on the Billboard country chart, and it remains a classic in country music.

Cline had planned to include the song on her upcoming album, called Faded Love, along with two other singles to be released that year. The album was not released as planned at the end of March because of her death. Instead, the song was included on a double compilation album called The Patsy Cline Story. The compilation featured all of Cline's big hits and is still in print.

Chart performance

Use in popular culture
The song was featured on the ABC drama series Lost in episode three of the first season entitled "Tabula Rasa".

The song can be heard in the 1989 film, The Wizard, starring Fred Savage.

Cover versions
LeAnn Rimes recorded a cover of the song for her LeAnn Rimes (album) in 1999. Rissi Palmer recorded a cover of the song for her self-titled debut album in 2007. It was covered by Lorrie Morgan for her 2009 album, A Moment in Time, from which it was released as a single. It was recorded by The Czars and appears on their 2006 compilation album Sorry I Made You Cry.  Terri Clark covered it for her 2012 album Classic.

References

1963 singles
Patsy Cline songs
2009 singles
LeAnn Rimes songs
Lorrie Morgan songs
Rissi Palmer songs
Song recordings produced by Owen Bradley
Songs written by Webb Pierce
1963 songs
Songs written by Wayne Walker (songwriter)